Ananadasharm High School one of the oldest high schools in Uttar Kannada, was a private school located in Bankikodla-Hanehalli. Anandasharm High School is providing education from eighth standard through tenth standard (S. S. L. C). The medium of instruction is Kannada. The school was funded by Mangesh N. Kulakrni, Ananth Ramachandra Kagal family, and D. M. Nadkarni Chitrapur Saraswat Brahmins and others from Bankikodla-Hanehalli. Kulkarni was a printing press owner in Mumbai whereas Kagal was Chief Inspector of Factories, Bombay. Anandasharm is the name of ninth Guru of Chitrapur Saraswats CSBs (they are called 'Bhanaps' in Mumbai). Ramakanth V. Pandit from Aghanashini was the first headmaster of the high school from 1941 to 1966. He was a B. A (mathematics), B.T., M.Ed. The high school is now supported by the Karnataka Secondary Education Board, Bangalore.

In the early years of the high school, high school accommodated students from 5th grade to 11th grade S.S.C and some subjects were taught in English.

History

The history of this high school goes back to its middle school the vernacular school of 1884. The leaders of Chitrapur Saraswat Brahmins during the British rule in India established the Rural Education Society (RES) and took the task of spreading education. Ananth Shanthappayya Nadkarni a.k.a. Budavant master from Bankikodla started the school in 1884. Datt master (D. A. Nadkarni a nephew of headmaster Ananth S. Nadkarni) was the headmaster of this middle school from 1911 to 1941. Perhaps, the vernacular middle school of 1884 is considered as one of the oldest vernacular schools in the nation. Later the middle school was upgraded to Anandasharm High School in 1941. In the early days, classes were held in Bakanatheshwar temple and in Dinu Master's (D. M. Nadkarni) house.

Torke Kannada Primary School is the other oldest school in the region established in the 1850s by Kawari family in  Torke gram.

Former Headmasters of the Anandasharm High School

 R. V. Pandit (1911 – 1999), from Aghanashini, in school 1941 - 1966, 1941 - 1966 as headmaster
 Su Ram Ekkundi (1922 – 1995), from Ranebennur, in school 1944 - 1976, 1966 - 76 as headmaster
 N. S. Naik (1927 – 2008), from Bankikodla-Hanehalli, in school 1948 - 1982, 1976 - 1982 as headmaster

Notable former teachers of the High School

 Narayan H. Gouda
 Gourish Kaikini
 Pandit Ramesh Nadkarni
 Subbanna R. Ekkundi

Notable alumni of the High School

 Gopal H. Gaonkar
 Narayan H. Gowda, Kadame
 Mangesh V. Nadkarni
 Sundar V. Nadkarni
 Niranjan K. Naik, Agragone

Former Headmasters of the Middle School

 Ananth S. Nadkarni a.k.a. Budavanta master from Bankikodla started the Verrnacular School in 1884 and served until 1910 as headmaster 
 Datt master Nadkarni (D. A. Nadkarni) (Doddmane) (1878 - 1954) from Bankikodla, Vernacular School, in school 1898 - 1941, 1911 - 1941 as headmaster

Notable alumni of the Middle School

 Gangadhar V. Chittal
 Yashwant V. Chittal

See also

 Education in India
 Literacy in India

References

External links 

Schools in Uttara Kannada district
Educational institutions established in 1884
1884 establishments in India